Sergio Rodríguez Reche (born 22 February 1992) is a Spanish cyclist, who currently rides for UCI Continental team .

References

External links

1992 births
Living people
Spanish male cyclists
Sportspeople from Pamplona
Cyclists from Navarre